Tidewater Provincial Park is a provincial park located on five islands in the Moose River estuary between Moosonee and Moose Factory, Ontario, Canada:

Charles Island
South Charles Island
Butler Island
Hayes Island
Bushy Island

The park was created in 1964 and is operated by the Town of Moosonee rather than the Ministry of Natural Resources. Access to the park is by boat only, including water taxis from Moosonee.

Camping
Overnight camping was eliminated due to cuts in 2012 and park is no longer listed on the Ontario Parks website.

As of 2015 Tidewater is again listed on the Ontario Parks website and pamphlets are displayed at Provincial Parks promoting Tidewater as a destination. Though the park is operational, it only consists of 20 tent sites that are available on a first-come-first-served basis.

References

External links
 

Provincial parks of Ontario
Protected areas of Cochrane District
Protected areas established in 1964
1964 establishments in Ontario